This is a list of candidates for the 1889 New South Wales colonial election. The election was held from 1 February to 16 February 1889.

Retiring Members

Protectionist
Frederick Crouch MLA (Richmond)
John Gale MLA (Murray)
Robert Smith MLA (Macleay)

Free Trade
Angus Cameron MLA (Kiama)
William Cortis MLA (Bathurst)
William Davis MLA (Canterbury)
William Henson MLA (Canterbury)
Isaac Ives MLA (St Leonards)
Alexander Kethel MLA (West Sydney)
William Martin MLA (Shoalhaven)
George Matheson MLA (Glen Innes)
John McElhone MLA (Upper Hunter)
George Merriman MLA (West Sydney)
Samuel Moore MLA (Inverell)
Joseph Penzer MLA (Bogan)
Fergus Smith MLA (West Macquarie)
William Wilkinson MLA (Glebe)
Alexander Wilson MLA (Bourke)
George Withers MLA (South Sydney)

Legislative Assembly
Sitting members are shown in bold text. Successful candidates are highlighted in the relevant colour and marked with an asterisk (*).

Electorates are arranged chronologically from the day the poll was held. Because of the sequence of polling, some sitting members who were defeated in their constituencies were then able to contest other constituencies later in the polling period. On the second occasion, these members are shown in italic text.

See also
 Members of the New South Wales Legislative Assembly, 1889–1891

References
 

1889